Martín Durand (born 30 May 1976) is an Argentine former rugby union footballer. His usual position is at flanker. He played for the Montpellier Hérault RC club in the French Top 14 competition.

Durand was born in Buenos Aires and played 60 games for Argentina, including as part of their 2003 Rugby World Cup and 2007 Rugby World Cup squads.

Durand was awarded the Olimpia de Plata for Rugby in 2006.

References

External links
 Martín Durand at UAR.com.ar
 Martín Durand on rwc2003.irb.com
 Martín Durand on lequipe.fr
 Martín Durand on ercrugby.com

1976 births
Argentine people of French descent
Rugby union players from Buenos Aires
Argentine rugby union players
Living people
Rugby union flankers
Argentina international rugby union players
Argentina international rugby sevens players